William Lafayette Darling (1856-1938), was a consulting engineer in St. Paul, Minnesota.

Early life and education
William Lafayette Darling was born in Oxford, Massachusetts on March 24, 1856. He was educated at Worcester Polytechnic Institute (Bachelor of Science, 1877), where he lettered in baseball and football. He became a Doctor of Engineering in 1927.

Career
Entered engineering construction, Northern Pacific Railroad, 1879 to 1883; division engineer, St. Paul and Northern Pacific (now Northern Pacific), 1883 to 1884; engineer, Chicago, Burlington and Quincy, 1884; engineer, location and construction, St. Andrews Bay and Chipley, 1884 to 1885; resident engineer in charge of terminals in St. Paul and Minneapolis, Chicago, Burlington and Northern (now Chicago, Burlington and Quincy), 1885 to 1887; engineer, location and construction, Duluth, Watertown and Pacific (now Great Northern Railway), 1887; located the line afterwards built by the Great Northern from Sioux Falls to Yankton, South Dakota, 1887 to 1888; engineer in charge of washout repairs from Minot, North Dakota, to Great Falls, Montana, Great Northern, 1888. The following positions with the Northern Pacific: in charge of construction of Howe truss bridge[s] in Montana, 1888 to 1889; in charge of location and construction of line from Little Falls to Staples, Minnesota, 1889; in charge of location and construction of the Coeur d'Alene Branch, 1889 to 1890; principal assistant engineer in charge of engineering and construction, 1891 to 1892; division engineer in charge of engineering from St. Paul, Minnesota, to Billings, Montana, 1892 to 1896; division engineer and assistant chief engineer, 1896 to 1901; chief engineer, 1901 to 1903. Chief engineer and vice-president, Gulf Construction Company, building a line from St. Louis to Kansas City, 1905; chief engineer, Pacific Railway (now Chicago, Milwaukee, St. Paul and Pacific Railroad), 1905 to 1906; chief engineer, Northern Pacific system and allied lines and during same period was vice-president and construction engineer in charge of construction of the Portland and Seattle Railway (now Spokane, Portland and Seattle), also during this period was construction engineer of the Pittsburgh and Gilmore.

In 1916 he became a consulting engineer, at St. Paul with the following activities: Associate member, Naval Consulting Board during the World War I; appointed a member of the Advisory Commission of Railway Experts to Russia by the Secretary of State, 1917; Member of Board of Economics and Engineering for the Owners of Railroad Securities in New York, 1921 to 1922. Public office: Member, City Planning Board, St. Paul; Member, City Zoning Board, St. Paul.

In 1926, the Trustees of the Worcester Polytechnic Institute established the policy of granting a limited number of honorary degrees, including Doctor of Engineering. In 1927, the degree was conferred upon William L. Darling.

Personal life
Darling married Alice Ernestine Bevans on April 15, 1901, and they had three children.

He died in St. Paul on October 27, 1938.

Clubs and fraternities
Member American Railway Engineering Association (former director); American Society of Civil Engineers; Permanent Association of Navigation Congresses; General Contractors of America (honorary member); Minnesota Club, St. Paul; University Club, St. Paul; Thirty-second degree Mason; Shriner.

References

Further reading
 No author. Who’s Who in Railroading – United States, Canada, Mexico, Cuba – 1930 Edition. New York: Simmons-Boardman, 1930, p. 124.
 Worcester Polytechnic Institute. Seventy Years of the Worcester Polytechnic Institute. Available on the Web at www.wpi.edu/Academics/Library/Archives/SeventyYears/page342.html.
 WPI Journal. "People of the Century: Building Iron Rails." Worcester Polytechnic Institute: Spring, 1988. Available on the Web at: www.wpi.edu/News/Journal/Spring98/rails.html. Ironically, four of the five WPI civil engineering graduates listed in this article are early veterans of the Northern Pacific!
 Dorsey, Michael W. "Maintaining a Lifeline." WPI Transformations. Discusses NP veterans Darling and Benjamin O. Johnson's experiences as Americans working to maintain the Trans-Siberian Railroad during World War I. Available on the Web at: www.wpi.edu/News/Transformations/2005Winter/timecapsule.html.
 Personal papers from Darling's time in Russia circa World War I are held by the Hoover Institution, Stanford University. Official papers as chief engineer of the Northern Pacific Railway are held by the Minnesota Historical Society, St. Paul, Minnesota.

1856 births
1938 deaths
Northern Pacific Railway people
Chicago, Burlington and Quincy Railroad people
Chicago, Milwaukee, St. Paul and Pacific Railroad
American civil engineers
Rail transport in Siberia
American people in rail transportation
Worcester Polytechnic Institute alumni
Great Northern Railway (U.S.)
American expatriates in the Russian Empire